Evan M. Woodward (March 11, 1838 – August 15, 1904) was an American Medal of Honor recipient who fought in the Union Army during the American Civil War. Woodward was born in Philadelphia, Pennsylvania and is now buried at Riverview Cemetery, New Jersey.

Medal of Honor citation 
For extraordinary heroism on December 13, 1862, in action at Fredericksburg, Virginia. First Lieutenant Woodward advanced between the lines, demanded and received the surrender of the 19th Georgia Infantry and captured their battle flag.

References 

1838 births
1904 deaths
Union Army officers
People from Philadelphia
American Civil War recipients of the Medal of Honor
United States Army Medal of Honor recipients